The 1988 Open Clarins was a women's tennis tournament played on outdoor clay courts in Paris, France, and was part of the Category 1 tier of the 1988 WTA Tour. It was the second edition of the tournament and was held from 19 September until 25 September 1988. Qualifier Petra Langrová won the singles title.

Finals

Singles

 Petra Langrová defeated  Sandra Wasserman 7–6(7–0), 6–2
 It was Langrová's only title of the year and the 1st of her career.

Doubles

 Alexia Dechaume /  Emmanuelle Derly defeated  Louise Field /  Nathalie Herreman 6–0, 6–2
 It was Dechaume's only title of the year and the 1st of her career. It was Derly's only title of the year and the 1st of her career.

References

External links
 ITF tournament edition details
 Tournament draws

Open Clarins
Clarins Open
1988 in Paris
1988 in French tennis